The following is a list of people associated with the University of Louisville.

Notable alumni

Arts and entertainment
 Harriette Simpson Arnow (BS 1930) – former author, best known for The Dollmaker
 Terry Bisson (BA 1964) – contemporary science fiction author
 Nick DeMartino (BA) – former Senior Vice President, Media and Technology for the American Film Institute
 Bob Edwards  (BA 1969) –  former host of NPR's Morning Edition, host of The Bob Edwards Show on XM Satellite Radio and PRI's Bob Edwards Weekend
 Howard Fineman (JD 1975) – Newsweek chief political analyst
 Sam Gilliam (BFA 1955, MFA 1961) – painter, specializing in color field and abstract art
 Sue Grafton (BA 1961) – contemporary detective novel author
 Edward N. Hamilton, Jr (BFA 1969) –  sculptor, works include York, the Spirit of Freedom, and the Amistad Memorial
 Michael Jackman – columnist, poet, essayist, fiction writer, and college professor
 Static Major – singer, songwriter, most famous from his work with Lil Wayne on "Lollipop"
 Delfeayo Marsalis (MA 2004) – jazz trombonist and record producer; brother of Wynton Marsalis and son of Ellis Marsalis
 Amanda Matthews (BA) – sculptor and painter
 Beverle Graves Myers – author of historical mystery novels and short stories
 Mary Spencer Nay (BA 1941, MA 1960) – painter and printmaker
 Marsha Norman (BA 1969) – Pulitzer Prize and Tony Award-winning playwright
 Barbara A. Perry  (BA 1978) – author; political analyst; Senior Fellow, University of Virginia Miller Center of Public Affairs; former Carter Glass Professor of Government, Sweet Briar College
 Diane Sawyer – attended but did not graduate law school; anchor of ABC World News
 Ben Sollee – cellist, singer, and songwriter
 Henry Strater – painter, illustrator
Kenneth Victor Young (BA, MA) – painter, designer, educator

Business
 Owsley Brown Frazier (BA 1958, JD 1960) – former director of Brown-Forman Corporation
 Robert Nardelli (MBA 1975) – CEO of Chrysler; former CEO of Home Depot; former CEO of General Electric Company
 Frank Neuhauser (BS 1934) – patent attorney; winner of the first National Spelling Bee in 1925
 James Patterson (MBA 1955) – co-founder of Long John Silvers, Rally's Hamburgers, and Chi-Chi's restaurant chains, President of Pattco Investments
 Leslie Stephen Wright (1913–97) – President of Samford University in Birmingham, Alabama 1958–83

Politics
 David L. Armstrong (JD 1969) – former mayor of Louisville (1996–2002)
 Reuf Bajrovic – former Minister of Energy of Federation of Bosnia and Herzegovina (BA 2000)
 Solon Borland (MD 1841) – former U.S. Senator (D), Arkansas
 Christopher Dodd (JD 1972) – former U.S. Senator (D), Connecticut
 James B. Edwards (DMD 1955) – former U.S. Secretary of Energy and Governor of South Carolina
 Charles R. Farnsley (LL.B. 1926) – Kentucky General Assembly 1936–40; Mayor of Louisville 1948–53; U.S. House of Representatives 1965–67
 Gina Haspel – Director of CIA (BA 1978)
 Henry D. Hatfield (DMD 1900) – former U.S. Senator and Governor of West Virginia
 David L. Huber – former U.S. Attorney for the Western District of Kentucky
 Addison James – United States Representative from Kentucky
 Thomas Lee Judge – 18th governor of Montana
 John A. Logan (JD 1851) – Union General in the Civil War, won Medal of Honor at Vicksburg, led Union forces at Battle of Atlanta, Senator for Illinois
 Romano Mazzoli (JD 1960) – representative for KY's 3rd US Congressional District 1971–95
 Mitch McConnell (BA 1964) – U.S. Senator and Majority Leader (R), Kentucky
 Louie Nunn (JD 1950) – Governor of Kentucky (1967–71)
 Jim Smith – member of the Indiana Senate
 Evan B. Stotsenburg – President Pro Tempore of the Indiana Senate; Indiana Attorney General (1915–1917)
 Ben Waide (BS) – member of the Kentucky House of Representatives

Religion 

Aryeh Kaplan (BA 1961) – American Orthodox rabbi, author, and translator known for his knowledge of physics and kabbalah

Science and engineering 

James Gilbert Baker (BA 1935) – winner of Presidential Award for Merit, developed the Baker-Schmidt telescope, pushed for U2 spy plane development
Lawrence F. Dahl (BS 1951) – professor emeritus of chemistry at the University of Wisconsin–Madison
Keith Fitzgerald (BA 1994) – political scientist and immigration policy pundit
Thomas L. Maddin (1826–1908) – Confederate physician, professor of medicine at the Vanderbilt University School of Medicine
David Meade – book author
Renã A. S. Robinson (B.S. 2000) – spectrometry, proteomics, Alzheimer's disease and aging
Gary Sullivan (B.S. 1982, MEng 1983) – researcher and standardization leader in video compression technology including H.264/AVC and HEVC
Chang-Lin Tien (MEng 1957) – UC Berkeley chancellor 1990–97; engineering scholar

Notable faculty
 William Burke Belknap – economist; hardware manufacturer; philanthropist; horse breeder; Professor of Economics at the University of Louisville
 Jim Chen – legal scholar and expert on constitutional law
 Colin Crawford – legal scholar and dean of the University of Louisville School of Law
 Paul W. Ewald – evolutionary biologist credited as one scientist who devised the Trade-Off Hypothesis
 Agnes Moore Fryberger – first director of music appreciation at the university
 Kee Chang Huang – distinguished professor of pharmacology
 Michael Jackman – columnist, poet, essayist and fiction writer
 Melanie B. Jacobs – legal scholar and dean of the University of Louisville School of Law
 John LaBarbera – jazz professor, nominated for 2005 Grammy award in the Best Large Jazz Ensemble category for his CD On the Wild Side
 Justin McCarthy – discredited Armenian genocide denier
 Mary Spencer Nay – painter and printmaker
 Tom Owen – Professor of Libraries and Community Relations Associate, Louisville Metro Council representative
 James Speed – lecturer, U.S. Attorney General under President Abraham Lincoln
 Eugenia Wang – professor with a primary focus in researching the genetic aspect of aging in humans
 Harold G. Wren – legal scholar and law school dean
 Manning G. Warren III – holder of the H. Edward Harter Chair of Commercial Law
 Roman Yampolskiy – computer scientist known for his work on artificial intelligence safety

Notable athletic alumni

Football

Current NFL players
 Jaire Alexander – cornerback, Green Bay Packers
 Teddy Bridgewater (2011–2014) – Minnesota Vikings, New Orleans Saints, Denver Broncos  Miami   Dolphins  quarterback
 Jamon Brown – offensive tackle, Green Bay Packers
 Preston Brown (2010–13) – Buffalo Bills linebacker
 Lamar Jackson (2015–2018) – quarterback for Baltimore Ravens; NFL; 2016 Heisman Trophy winner
 DeVante Parker (2011–14) – Miami Dolphins wide receiver
 Bilal Powell (2007–10) – New York Jets running back
 Povl-Timothy Wise water boy

Current CFL players
 Victor Anderson
 Otis Floyd (1995–98) – Hamilton Tiger-Cats linebacker
 Adam Froman (2009–10) – Winnipeg Blue Bombers quarterback
 Trent Guy – Toronto Argonauts slotback
 Montrell Jones (2001–02) – Montreal Alouettes wide receiver
 Joshua Tinch (2002–05) – Saskatchewan Roughriders wide receiver
 Jonta Woodard (2001–02) – Hamilton Tiger-Cats offensive tackle

Current AFL players
 Donovan Arp (1999–2000) – Austin Wranglers offensive/defensive lineman
 Kevin Gaines (1990–93) – Grand Rapids Rampage defensive back
 Jason Hilliard (2001–04) – Columbus Destroyers offensive lineman
 Will Rabatin (2001–04) – Columbus Destroyers offensive/defensive lineman

Current UFL players
 Brian Brohm (2004–07) – Las Vegas Locomotives quarterback 2011–present
 Ronnie Ghent (1997–2001) – Hartford Colonials tight end

Former pros
 David Akers (1992–95) – San Francisco 49ers kicker; five-time Pro Bowl selection (2001, 2002, 2004, 2005, 2010)
 Bruce Armstrong (1983–86) – former New England Patriots offensive lineman; played in the NFL for 14 seasons; six-time Pro Bowl selection (1990, 1991, 1994, 1995, 1996 and 1997); one of only 11 inducted into the Patriots Hall of Fame; one of only seven to have his number retired
 Deion Branch (2000–01) – New England Patriots wide receiver; Super Bowl XXXIX MVP with the New England Patriots, tied record for catches in a Super Bowl
 Ray Buchanan (1989–91) – former Atlanta Falcons, Indianapolis Colts, and Oakland Raiders defensive back
 Curry Burns (1998–2002) – free agent safety
 Michael Bush (2003–06) – Chicago Bears running back
 Mark Clayton (1979–82) – former Miami Dolphins and Green Bay Packers wide receiver; five-time Pro Bowl selection (1984, 1985, 1986, 1988 and 1991)
 Harry Douglas (2003–07) – Tennessee Titans wide receiver
 Elvis Dumervil (2002–05) – Denver Broncos, Baltimore Ravens defensive end; tied the NCAA single-season sack record (24); was a first team All-American and the 2005 Bronko Nagurski Trophy winner as college football's Defensive Player of the Year; 2005 Ted Hendricks Award as college football's top defensive end
 Renardo Foster (2003–06) – free agent offensive lineman
 William Gay (2003–06) – Pittsburgh Steelers cornerback
 Antoine Harris (2002–05) – free agent defensive back
 Nate Harris (2005–06) – free agent linebacker
 Earl Heyman (2005–09) – New Orleans Saints defensive tackle
 Ernest Givins (1984–85) – former Houston Oilers and Jacksonville Jaguars wide receiver; two-time Pro Bowl selection (1990 and 1992)
 Ernie Green (1959–62) – former Green Bay Packers and Cleveland Browns running back and fullback
 Jay Gruden (1985–88) – former Arena Football League quarterback for the Tampa Bay Storm, led the team to four ArenaBowl championships; League MVP in 1992 and MVP of ArenaBowl VII; first quarterback inducted into the Arena Football Hall of Fame in 1998; head coach of the Washington Redskins; former head coach of the Orlando Predators, led the team to titles in ArenaBowls XII and XIII
 Tom Jackson (1970–72) – former Denver Broncos linebacker; three-time Pro Bowl selection (1977–79); analyst on ESPN's NFL Gameday; two-time Missouri Valley Conference player of the year (1971, 1972)
 Joe Jacoby (1977–80) – former Washington Redskins offensive lineman; key member of "The Hogs"; member of Super Bowl XVII, Super Bowl XXII, and Super Bowl XXVI Championship teams; four-time Pro Bowl selection (1983–86)
 Brandon Johnson (2002–05) – Cincinnati Bengals linebacker
 Chris Johnson (2001–02) – Oakland Raiders defensive back
 Joe Johnson (1990–93) – former New Orleans Saints and Green Bay Packers defensive end; two-time Pro Bowl selection (1998 and 2000)
 Stefan LeFors  (2000–05; played 2001–04) – former quarterback with the Carolina Panthers in the NFL and the Edmonton Eskimos and Winnipeg Blue Bombers in the CFL; head high school football coach at the Christian Academy of Louisville
 Lenny Lyles (1954–57) – drafted by the Baltimore Colts in the first round (11th overall) of the 1958 NFL Draft; one-time Pro Bowl selection; one of the first African American football players at the University of Louisville; often referred to as "the fastest man in football"
 Sam Madison (1993–96) – former Miami Dolphins and New York Giants defensive back; four-time Pro Bowl selection (1999, 2000, 2001, and 2002)
 Frank Minnifield (1979–82) – former Cleveland Browns defensive back; four-time Pro Bowl selection (1986–89); co-creator of the "Dawg Pound"; led nation in kickoff returns in 1981 and punt returns in 1982
 Roman Oben (1991–95) – offensive lineman
 Amobi Okoye (2003–06) – Chicago Bears defensive lineman
 Richard Owens (1999–2003) – free agent tight end
 Chris Redman (1996–99) – Atlanta Falcons quarterback; 1999 Johnny Unitas Golden Arm Award winner
 Kerry Rhodes (2001–04) – Arizona Cardinals defensive back, 2005 NFL All-Rookie team
 Kolby Smith (2003–06) – free agent running back
 Jason Spitz (2002–05) – Jacksonville Jaguars offensive lineman
 Montavious Stanley (2002–05) – free agent defensive tackle
 Howard Stevens – running back, Baltimore Colts, New Orleans Saints; member of Louisville Athletic Hall of Fame
 Johnny Unitas (1951–54) – former Baltimore Colts quarterback; Pro Football Hall of Fame member, three-time NFL Most Valuable Player
 Dewayne White (2000–02) – Detroit Lions defensive end
 Otis Wilson (1976–79) – first team All-American defensive end; member of the Chicago Bears Super Bowl XX Championship team

Men's basketball
Rakeem Buckles (2009–12) – professional basketball player in the Israeli Basketball Premier League
Taqwa Pinero, formerly known as Taquan Dean (2003-05) - professional basketball player for the Phoenix Suns (NBA Summer league 2008), Unicaja Málaga (2009–2010), Élan Béarnais Pau-Lacq-Orthez (2017-2019)
Trey Lewis (2015–2016) – professional basketball player in the Israeli Basketball Premier League
 Mangok Mathiang (born 1992) - Australian-Sudanese basketball player for Hapoel Eilat of the Israeli Basketball Premier League
Donovan Mitchell (2015–17) – professional basketball player for the Utah Jazz (2017-2022), Cleveland Cavaliers (2022-present)
 Chinanu Onuaku (born 1996) - basketball player
Kenny Payne (1985–89) – professional basketball player for the Philadelphia 76ers (1989–1993), coach for the University of Louisville (2022–present)
Derek Smith (1979–82) – professional basketball player for the Golden State Warriors (1982–1983), Los Angeles/San Diego Clippers (1983–1986), Sacramento Kings (1986–1989), Philadelphia 76ers (1989–1993), and Boston Celtics (1990–1991) 
Russ Smith - former NBA player, currently in the Israeli Basketball Premier League

All-Americans
(listed in chronological order)
 Bob Lochmueller (1949–52) 
 Charlie Tyra (1954–57)
 Don Goldstein (1956–59) – All-American, Pan American Games gold medalist
 Jack Turner (1958–61)
 Wes Unseld (1965–68) – three-time All-American; former member of the Baltimore/Washington Bullets; 5-time NBA All-Star; second person ever to win both NBA Rookie of the Year and NBA Most Valuable Player in the same season; named to the NBA's 50th Anniversary All-Time Team; inducted into the Naismith Memorial Basketball Hall of Fame in 1988
 Butch Beard (1966–69)
 Jim Price (1969–72)
 Junior Bridgeman (1972–75) – All-American in 1975
 Allen Murphy (1972–75)
 Phil Bond (1973–76)
 Wesley Cox (1974–77)
 Rick Wilson (1975–78)
 Darrell Griffith (1976–80) – 1980 John Wooden Award winner (player of the year) and Most Outstanding Player of the NCAA basketball tournament; former member of the Utah Jazz; 1981 NBA Rookie of the Year
 Lancaster Gordon (1981–84)
 Pervis Ellison (1985–89) – first freshman to be named Most Outstanding Player of the NCAA basketball tournament; first overall pick of the 1989 NBA Draft
 Clifford Rozier (1991–94)
 DeJuan Wheat (1994–97)
 Reece Gaines (2000–03)
 Francisco García (2003–05) – led team to 2005 Final Four; former member of Sacramento Kings; member of the Houston Rockets
 Terrence Williams (2005–09) – led team to back to back Elite 8s; former member of Houston Rockets; member of the Boston Celtics

Women's basketball
 Angel McCoughtry (2005–09) – Big East Player of the Year and All-American in 2007, 2008, and 2009; led the Cardinals to the 2009 NCAA final; first overall pick in the 2009 WNBA draft by the Atlanta Dream; 2009 Rookie of the Year
 Shoni Schimmel (2010–14) – led the Cardinals to the 2013 NCAA final; chosen eighth overall in the 2014 WNBA draft by the Dream

Baseball
 Zack Burdi – MLB pitcher in Arizona Diamondbacks organization
 Reid Detmers – MLB pitcher for the Los Angeles Angels
 Chris Dominguez – former MLB infielder and head coach for the Bellarmine Knights
 Adam Duvall – MLB player for the Atlanta Braves and formerly the San Francisco Giants and Cincinnati Reds; 2016 All-Star and 2016 Home Run Derby participant
 Drew Ellis – MLB infielder, Seattle Mariners
 Cody Ege – former MLB pitcher
 Adam Engel – MLB outfielder, Chicago White Sox
 Kyle Funkhouser – MLB pitcher, Detroit Tigers
 Chad Green – MLB pitcher, New York Yankees
 Sean Green (1997–2000) – former MLB pitcher
 Bryan Hoeing – MLB pitcher, Miami Marlins
 Zach Jackson, – former MLB pitcher
 Jarred Kelenic – MLB outfielder, Seattle Mariners
 Dean Kiekhefer – former MLB pitcher
 Matt Koch – MLB pitcher
 Fred Koster (1926-1928), – former MLB outfielder
 Trystan Magnuson – former MLB pitcher
 Justin Marks – former MLB pitcher
 Kyle McGrath – MLB pitcher
 Brendan McKay (2014–2017) – first baseman and pitcher, Tampa Bay Rays; consensus national college player of the year in 2017
 Corey Ray – MLB outfielder, Milwaukee Brewers
 Josh Rogers – MLB pitcher, Miami Marlins
 B. J. Rosenberg – former MLB pitcher
 Will Smith – MLB catcher, Los Angeles Dodgers
 Nick Solak – MLB infielder, Texas Rangers
 Logan Wyatt – MLB first baseman, San Francisco Giants
 Tony Zych – former MLB pitcher

Track and field
 Tone Belt (2005–present) – won the 2007 NCAA indoor long jump national title, UofL's first-ever track national title in track and field
 Andre Black (2005–present) – won the 2007 NCAA indoor triple jump national title, UofL's second-ever national title in track and field
 Kelley Bowman (2002–06) – two-time All-American high jumper; finished 3rd in nation in the high jump at 2006 NCAA National Championships with a UofL record of 6 feet, 1.25 inches; holds Kentucky high school girls' record (5 feet, 10.5 inches); won four consecutive KY state titles at Berea High School; had 4th best jump in the nation in 2000
 Wesley Korir (2006–08) – multiple All-America in distance running; winner of the 2012 Boston Marathon; member of the Kenyan Parliament, 2013–2017

Other sports
 Adam Hadwin (2009) – PGA golfer, winner of 2017 Valspar Championship
 Scott Harrington – Indy car race driver, 1999 Indycar Rookie of the Year
Denis Petrashov (born 2000) - Kyrgyzstani Olympic swimmer
 Shannon Smyth (2005–08) – Republic of Ireland international soccer player

List of presidents of the University of Louisville
There have been 28 presidents and five interim presidents of what is (or was once a part of) the University of Louisville.

Jefferson Seminary (1813–29)
 Mann Butler 1813–16
 William Tompkins 1816–21
 Charles M. M'Crohan 1821–25
 Francis E. Goddard 1826–29

Louisville Collegiate Institute (1837–40)
 Benjamin F. Farnsworth 1837–38
 John Hopkins Harney 1838–40

Louisville College (1840–46)
 John Hopkins Harney 1840–44

Louisville Medical Institute (1837–1846)
 John Rowan 1837–42
 William Garvin 1842–43
 James Guthrie 1843–46

University of Louisville (post merger of LMI and LC) (1846–present)
 Samuel Smith Nicholas 1846–47
 James Guthrie 1847–69
 Isaac Caldwell 1869–86
 James Speed Pirtle 1886–05
 Theodore L. Burnett 1905–11
 David William Fairleigh 1911–14
 Arthur Younger Ford 1914–26
 George Colvin 1926–28
 John Letcher Patterson 1928–29 (acting)
 Raymond Asa Kent 1929–43
 Einar William Jacobsen 1943–46
 Frederick William Stamm 1946–47 (acting)
 John Wilkinson Taylor 1947–50
 Eli Huston Brown III 1950–51 (acting)
 Philip Grant Davidson 1951–68

University of Louisville, as part of the Kentucky state system
 Woodrow Mann Strickler 1968–72
 William Ferdinand Ekstrom 1972–73 (acting)
 James Grier Miller 1973–80
 William Ferdinand Ekstrom 1980–81 (acting)
 Donald C. Swain 1981–95
 John W. Shumaker 1995–2002
 Carol Garrison 2002 (acting)
 James R. Ramsey 2002–16
 Neville G. Pinto 2016–17 (acting)
 Gregory C. Postel 2017–2018 (acting)
 Neeli Bendapudi 2018–2022
 Lori Stewart Gonzalez 2022–present (interim)

See also
 University of Louisville
 Louisville Cardinals
 Louisville Cardinal's Radio Affiliates
 Louisville Cardinals Conference Championships by Year
 List of people from the Louisville metropolitan area

References

External links
UofL library archives list of presidents

 
University of Louisville people
Louisville, Kentucky-related lists